Alpine skiing at the 2014 Winter Olympics was held in Russia  from 9–22 February at Rosa Khutor Alpine Resort near Krasnaya Polyana, east of Sochi.

Competition schedule

The following is the competition schedule for all ten events.

All times are (UTC+4).

Course information

Medal summary
Several age records in alpine skiing were set at these Olympic Games:
Bode Miller, age 36, became the oldest medalist in Olympic alpine skiing; bronze in super-G.
Mikaela Shiffrin, age 18, became the youngest champion in slalom in Olympic alpine skiing; gold in slalom.
Mario Matt, age 34, became the oldest champion in Olympic alpine skiing; gold in slalom.
Henrik Kristoffersen, age 19, became the youngest male medalist in Olympic alpine skiing; bronze in slalom.

Medal table

Men's events

Two bronze medals were awarded  in the super-G.

Women's events

Two gold medals were awarded  in the downhill, the first-ever tie for gold in an Olympic alpine skiing event; no silver medal was awarded.

Qualification

A maximum of 320 (later adjusted to 350 by the International Ski Federation) quota spots were available to athletes to compete at the games. A maximum of 22 athletes could be entered by a National Olympic Committee, with a maximum of 14 men or 14 women. There were two qualification standards for the games: an A standard and a B standard.

Participating nations
327 athletes from 74 nations were scheduled to participate, with number of athletes in parentheses. Only 319 athletes competed in actual competition as the other 8 athletes suffered injuries during training. Four nations qualified for the Winter Olympics for the first time, and hence competed in alpine skiing for the first time as well: Malta, Timor-Leste, Togo and Zimbabwe. Both Venezuela and Thailand made their Olympic debuts in the sport. One of Thailand's skiers was world-renowned concert violinist "Vanessa-Mae" Vanakorn.  India's athletes initially competed as Independent Olympic Participants, as the Indian Olympic Association was suspended by the International Olympic Committee, but the suspension had since been lifted.

References

External links

FIS-Ski.com – alpine skiing – 2014 Winter Olympics – Sochi, Russia

Official Results Book – Alpine Skiing

 
Alpine skiing at the Winter Olympics
Alpine skiing
Winter Olympics
Alpine skiing competitions in Russia